Jadu Zehi Hajji Piri (also Romanized as Jādū Zehī Ḩājjī Pīrī; also known as Jāddeh Zā’ī, Jāddeh Zehī, Jado Zī, Jādū Zehī, Jad Zā’ī, and Jadzī) is a village in Polan Rural District, Polan District, Chabahar County, Sistan and Baluchestan Province, Iran. At the 2006 census, its population was 375, in 75 families.

References 

Populated places in Chabahar County